Deuil – Montmagny station is a railway station in Deuil-la-Barre, France, that also serves Montmagny. It is situated on the Épinay-Villetaneuse–Le Tréport-Mers railway, between Gare d'Épinay-Villetaneuse and Gare de Persan-Beaumont. It is served by Transilien trains from Paris-Nord to Persan-Beaumont and to Luzarches. The daily number of passengers was between 2,500 and 7,500 in 2002. The station has 145 free parking spaces.  The station was opened in 1877, when the Épinay-Villetaneuse – Persan-Beaumont section of the Épinay-Villetaneuse–Le Tréport-Mers railway was opened by the Compagnie des chemins de fer du Nord.

Bus routes

RATP 256 and 556

Gallery

References

External links
 

Railway stations in Val-d'Oise
Railway stations in France opened in 1877